Michael Pitiot (born 14 July 1970) is a French screenwriter and film director. He lives and works in France.

Life and career
Michael Pitiot shot his first reportages in Zaïre in 1991. He was then recruited as audiovisual attaché at the French embassy in Vietnam, responsible for cooperation with radio and television in Ho Chi Minh City, a position he occupied from 1993 to 1998.

From 1998 to 2000, he travelled back to France aboard a Chinese junk christened Sao Mai and specially built for the journey, with Marielle Laheurte and a team of 30 volunteers from widely differing backgrounds (including the former naval lieutenant Pierre Guillaume, also known as Crabe-Tambour). He produced a documentary for France2 and wrote two accounts of this expedition.

From 2001 to 2003, alongside senior reporter Arnaud de la Grange, he organised a circumnavigation of Africa with 12 well-known writers including Erik Orsenna, Jean-Marie Gustave Le Clézio and Jean-Christophe Rufin. He also directed a documentary series on this literary and journalistic voyage entitled Portes d’Afrique, for Arte.
In 2003, he filmed a road movie through the former Soviet empire in Super8 with Laurent Lepesant that took him to Afghanistan. In 2004 he wrote an account of a voyage to Bhutan to discover its temple carpenter-builders with the illustrator Cloé Fontaine, who later became his wife.

Starting in 2006, he wrote a film script with journalist Daniel Duhand on the forgotten history of the «Poilus d’Alaska» (huskies) in 1915. The same year he joined Tara Expéditions to develop documentaries of its mission. In parallel, in 2009 he published a history of piracy, illustrated by Ségolène Marbach. In 2010, he produced a documentary series in four episodes for France Télévisions on the Tara Oceans mission, co-written with Thierry Ragobert and Frédéric Lossignol and with original music by Gérard Cohen-Tannugi.

Shortly afterwards he met the ecologist and photographer Yann Arthus Bertrand, with whom he co-produced Planet Ocean, a feature-length documentary about man and the ocean. This film, produced thanks to the support of the Omega brand, won the Best Cinematography Award at the Monterey Blue Festival (California, USA).
This was the first film produced during a four-year collaboration which also gave birth to three new feature-length documentaries with Yann Arthus-Bertrand: Méditerranée in 2013, which looks at the development of human civilisations in the Mediterranean basin, with the voice of Gérard Darmon and Hiam Abbass ; Algérie, an emotional journey to the heart of Algeria, narrated by Jalil Lespert. The film was aired in France and Algeria the same day in July 2015 ;  and TERRA, the sequel of Planet Ocean, a film dedicated to the story of mankind and life, narrated by Vanessa Paradis. Terra was premiered in December 2015 for the COP21 and available worldwide on Netflix by 2016.

In parallel, Michael Pitiot has devoted his time to writing fictional projects.

Filmography
 2001 : L'Odyssée de Sao Mai, 52 minutes, France 2
 2003 : Durban Zulu, 26 minutes, Arte
 2004 : Rivages d’Afrique, Côte Est, 52 minutes, Voyage
 2005 : Rivages d’Afrique, Côte Ouest, 52 minutes, Voyage
 2006 : Poilus d’Alaska, 90 mn, with Duhand et Jampolsky, Arte, Radio-Canada
 2008 : Tara, journey to the climate machine, 90mn, Roblin and Ragobert, Arte
 2009 : Au cœur d’une expédition polaire, 52 minutes, Planète
 2010 : The great Bloom, 52 minutes, France3, Pathé
 2010 : The Sacred Pact, 52 minutes, France3, Pathé
 2010 : The secret world, 52 minutes, France3, Pathé
 2011 : A lost Alliance, 52 minutes, France3, Pathé
 2012 : Tara Ocean, journey to the sources of life, 90 min, France5
 2012 : Planet Ocean, with Y. Arthus-Bertrand, 90min, France2, Universal Studios
 2013 : Mediterranean with Gérard Darmon, 90 min, France2, Universal Studios
 2015 : Algeria, with Y. Arthus-Bertrand, Yazid Tizi, Jalil Lespert, 90min, France2
 2015 : Thalassa. Le Climat, with Christophe Cousin, 110 min, France3
 2016 : Terra, with Y. Arthus-Bertrand, Vanessa Paradis, 90 min, France2, Netflix
 2017 : Maroc vu du ciel, 90 minutes, France Télévision, with Ali Baddou and Yann Arthus-Bertrand, France Télévisions
 2018 : Orient-Express, (script only) by Louis-Pascal Couvelaire, 90 min, Arte
 2018 : Men from Earth, with Laurent Stocker, 100 min, BBC, France Televisions
 2019 : Egypte vue du ciel, 90 min, with Pio Marmaï Yann Arthus-Bertrand, France Televisions
 2020 : In conversation with Eileen Gray, 24 min, Bard Graduate Center

References

External links

Official web site from Tara Expéditions
Planète Océan, official web site from the GoodPlanet Foundation
The New York Review of Books Sept 2020

1970 births
Living people
French male screenwriters
French screenwriters
French film directors